John Henry Boyes  (6 March 1886 – 1 July 1958) was the fifth Public Service Commissioner in New Zealand.

He was chairman of the Social Security Commission, in between his terms as Public Service Commissioner (1936-38 & 1941-46). In 1936 the Labour government would have preferred Boyes to Thomas Mark as Public Service Commissioner, so appointed Boyes and Mark as Joint Commissioners. There was an awkward two years, before Boyes was appointed to establish the new Social Security Department.

Boyes was born in Auckland. In 1935, he was awarded the King George V Silver Jubilee Medal. He was appointed a Companion of the Order of St Michael and St George in the 1946 New Year Honours.

He died in 1958 and was buried at Purewa Cemetery in Auckland.

References

External links
Political neutrality in practice, the Public Service Commission

1886 births
1958 deaths
New Zealand public servants
New Zealand Companions of the Order of St Michael and St George
Burials at Purewa Cemetery